The Queensland Railways B11 class locomotive was a class of 2-6-0 steam locomotive operated by the Queensland Railways.

History
In 1878, the Neilson and Company, Glasgow delivered four 2-6-0 locomotives to the Queensland Railways Southern & Western Railway. Originally classified as the C class, per Queensland Railway's classification system they were redesignated the B11 class in 1890, B representing that they had three driving axles, and the 11 the cylinder diameter in inches.

In 1888, three were transferred to Maryborough. The remaining member on the Southern & Western Railway was renumbered no. 36 to allow the B12 class to be consecutively numbered.

Class list

References

Neilson locomotives
Railway locomotives introduced in 1878
B11
2-6-0 locomotives
3 ft 6 in gauge locomotives of Australia